Kleinzee is a small village on the west coast of the Northern Cape province in South Africa at the mouth of the Buffels River. It is just south of Grootmis, 72 km south-east of Port Nolloth and 105 km west of Springbok. Previously a closed company town, it was known for its diamond-mining operations until the 2000s.

The Buffels River "flows" through Kleinsee, but most of the time it is just a dry river bed and only flows approximately every ten years. Bounded by semidesert and the Atlantic Ocean, it has a large underground water table.

History
It was originally the site of a freehold farm called Kleyne Zee. The name means 'small sea', referring to a lagoon at the mouth of the Buffels River. Jack Carstens was searching the coast (later Diamond Coast) for diamonds when he heard word of their discovery on the grounds of Kleyne Zee by locals de Villiers and Alberts in 1926. A crater was opened within a week. The Cape Coast Exploration Company bought it in 1927, which was then incorporated into De Beers the following year.

The Namaqualand Mines Division of De Beers established Kleinzee as a private alluvial diamond mining settlement. At its peak, it reportedly had a population of around 4 thousand. With access from the outside world restricted, Kleinzee was mostly inhabited by middle-class mine workers, managers, and their families. De Beers covered the residents' utility bills and invested in amenities such as pools, a golf course and sports fields, and hobby clubs.

The diamonds had begun to run out by the 2000s. The population of Kleinzee generally consisted of around 2 thousand residents, but considerably reduced after the down-scaling of mining activities in 2009.

Economy
With sparse vegetation, Kleinzee relies more so on fishing than farming. One of the few local industries De Beers has continued to invest in is oyster farming on the dams left by the mines.

Tourism
Both the nature and man made sites have drawn tourists to the village and its surrounding semidesert coastal area. Despite its reputation as a ghost town, the village, now more accessible to the public, has seen an uptick in tourism since De Beers' departure. Koos van der Merwe opened a resort in 2014, and a number of B&Bs and camping sites have since followed. It is on the Shipwreck Route and the Spektakel Daisies Pass.

Kleinzee Yacht Club
As part of De Beers' recreational investments, one of the cofferdams was converted into a half kilometre-long artificial lake for a yacht club with sailing and other water sports. Due to a lack of maintenance, it has a particularly high salt content, which gives the water a reddish-pink hue and enables people to float in it.

Boulder Heritage Route and Kleinzee Museum
Boulder Heritage Route is a historic trail through Kleinzee's old diamond mines. Kleinzee Museum also seeks to preserve the village's history.

Education
Laerskool Kleinzee is a private school with an attendance of 111 students. The Primary School became a Centre for learning and Development.

Transport
The village is serviced by the small Kleinzee Airport (KLZ). It is a 105 km drive from Springbok and the N7.

References

Populated places in the Nama Khoi Local Municipality
Mining communities in South Africa
Namaqualand